Karl August Bühler (February 2, 1904 – January 7, 1984) was a German politician of the Christian Democratic Union (CDU) and former member of the German Bundestag.

Life 
Bühler participated in the establishment of the CDU in Thuringia. After his escape, he became involved in the Baden CDU, where he was deputy CDU state chairman. He was a member of the state parliament in Baden-Württemberg from 1956. On 12 January 1958, he resigned his mandate. His successor became Franz Dietsche. He was a member of the German Bundestag from 1957 to 1969.

Literature

References

1904 births
1984 deaths
Members of the Bundestag for Baden-Württemberg
Members of the Bundestag 1965–1969
Members of the Bundestag 1961–1965
Members of the Bundestag 1957–1961
Members of the Bundestag for the Christian Democratic Union of Germany
Members of the Landtag of Baden-Württemberg